Gothic country (sometimes referred to as gothic Americana, Southern Gothic, the Denver sound, or even simply just dark country) is a genre of country music rooted in early jazz, gospel, Americana, gothic rock and post-punk. Its lyrics focus on dark subject matter. The genre has a regional scene in Denver.

History
Gothic country is rooted in early jazz, gospel, country, Americana, gothic rock and post-punk. The genre's lyrics focus on macabre and grim subject matter. J.D. Wilkes, frontman of the band Legendary Shack Shakers, described gothic country as "[taking] an angle that there’s something grotesque and beautiful in the traditions of the South, the backdrop of Southern living."

Slim Cessna's Auto Club, formed in 1992, often deals with lyrical themes derived from apocalyptic religious imagery, applying a gothic lyrical approach to country and gospel songs, although the band has denied that their songs are gothic. The following year, the gothic country group The Handsome Family formed; Andy Fyfe of Mojo called them "Americana's ghostly Sonny & Cher." A.V. Club reviewer Christopher Bahn compared their music to "a collaboration between Hank Williams and Edgar Allan Poe."

Johnny Cash's American Recordings series, produced by Rick Rubin, a producer best known for working with hip hop and heavy metal artists, was described as having a gothic country sound and image; amidst covers of songs by non-country artists such as Depeche Mode, Danzig and Nine Inch Nails, as well as traditional and World War II-era songs, Cash's album series lyrically derived from haunting, despaired themes such as death, and recurring religious themes in the form of dark gospel recordings.

A regional gothic country scene developed in Denver.

See also
List of gothic country artists

References

Country music genres
Country
Fusion music genres
Gothic country
American styles of music
Southern Gothic media